The Ljubibratić were a powerful noble family in (Hum) around Trebinje during the 14th and 15th centuries under the Bosnian Kingdom.

History
Ljubibratić family were known to be warriors and also Serbian Orthodox priests. They were from Trebinje region, and were mentioned in Ragusan documents.

Members
Damjan Ljubibratić (fl. 1596 – 1605), Serbian Orthodox monk and diplomat, the secretary of Patriarch Jovan Kantul (s. 1592–1614)
Stevan Ljubibratić (fl. 1661 – April 1737), Serbian Orthodox bishop of Dalmatia  
Savatije Ljubibratić (fl. 1687 – d. 1716), Serbian Orthodox bishop and caretaker of the Dragović monastery
Jeronim Ljubibratić (1716 – 1 November 1779), Ragusan military commander serving the Habsburg monarchy
Mićo Ljubibratić (1839 – February 26, 1889), Serbian Orthodox priest and rebel leader in Herzegovina

References

Sources

Serbian noble families
Bosnian noble families